"I Would've Loved You Anyway" is a song written by Mary Danna and Troy Verges, and recorded by American country music singer Trisha Yearwood. It was released in April 2001 as the lead single from her album Inside Out.  The song became a Top 5 hit, peaking at number 4 on the Billboard Country Chart.  It was Yearwood's first single in nearly two years to reach the Top 10 and is also her last single to reach the Top 10 to date.  "I Would've Loved You Anyway" also peaked at number 44 on the Billboard Hot 100, nearly reaching the Top 40.

Content
"I Would've Loved You Anyway" is a contemporary Country ballad about a relationship ending. A woman is reflecting over her relationship and its ultimate demise. She reveals that if she could have known how much pain the end of the relationship would bring, she still would have loved this person.

Music video
The music video for "I Would've Loved You Anyway" was made following the single's release. The video was filmed in Spain, to avoid using noticeable landmarks in Nashville or Hollywood backlots. The video begins with Yearwood in the back seat of a car, leaving the home of her lover. One particular scene showcases Yearwood and her lover having a conversation (presumably ending their relationship) on a majestic cliff overlooking a village and rolling hills. Yearwood is also featured singing alone in a traditional Spanish villa.

Chart performance

Year-end charts

References

2001 singles
2001 songs
Trisha Yearwood songs
Songs written by Troy Verges
MCA Nashville Records singles
Song recordings produced by Mark Wright (record producer)